A Mi Guitarra (To My Guitar) is the sixth studio album by Mexican singer-songwriter Juan Gabriel, released in 1975.

Track listing

References

External links
official website

1976 albums
Juan Gabriel albums
RCA Records albums
Spanish-language albums